Weverton Pereira da Silva (born 13 December 1987), simply known as Weverton, is a Brazilian professional footballer who plays as a goalkeeper for Palmeiras and the Brazil national team.

Club career
Born in Rio Branco, Acre, Weverton joined Corinthians' youth setup in 2006, aged 18, after impressing in a match for Juventus-AC. He was promoted to the former's main squad in 2007, but was demoted to fourth-choice after Rafael Santos' promotion. Weverton was subsequently loaned to Remo, Oeste and América de Natal. With the latter he appeared regularly in Série B, sharing minutes with the veteran Rodolpho.

Weverton was released by Timão in January 2010 and shortly after moved to Botafogo-SP. After impressing with the side, he signed for Portuguesa on 12 May. Weverton was an undisputed starter at Lusa, appearing in all league matches in 2011, as his side were crowned champions.

In May 2012, he joined Atlético Paranaense, after his previous contract expired. On 15 October 2014, after being named captain for the campaign, Wéverton renewed his contract until 2017.

In December 2017, Weverton joined Palmeiras on a five-year deal, for a rumoured fee of R$ 2 million. He missed the deciding penalty kick in the 2021 Recopa Sudamericana, resulting in a win for Defensa y Justicia.

In August 2021, after winning against São Paulo in the quarterfinals of Copa Libertadores, Weverton overcame Marcos as the Palmeiras player with the most victories in the competition, with a total of 28 wins.

International career
On 31 July 2016, Weverton was called by the Brazilian Olympic team for the 2016 Summer Olympics by manager Rogério Micale to replace Fernando Prass who left the team due to injury. In the gold medal match, Weverton made a key save against Germany's Nils Petersen on the fifth penalty shot, which helped Brazil win their first Olympic football gold.

After winning gold medal at the 2016 Rio Olympics, Weverton was called up by coach Tite to qualification matches against Ecuador and Colombia.

Weverton made his return, after more than three years, to the Brazil national team on 9 October 2020. On the subject of making his return, Weverton said that "It was a special game for me."

In June 2021, he was included in Brazil's squad for the 2021 Copa América on home soil. On 23 June, he appeared in Brazil's third group match, a 2–1 win over Colombia.

On 7 November 2022, Weverton was named in the squad for the 2022 FIFA World Cup. He was brought on as a substitute for Alisson Becker in the 80th minute of Brazil's round of 16 game against South Korea, with Brazil 4–1 up. He did not concede any as Brazil maintained the scoreline.

Career statistics

Club

International

Honours

Club
Corinthans
Campeonato Brasileiro Série B: 2008

Botafogo-SP
 Campeonato Paulista do Interior: 2010

Portuguesa
Campeonato Brasileiro Série B: 2011

Atlético Paranaense
 Campeonato Paranaense: 2016

Palmeiras
Campeonato Brasileiro Série A: 2018, 2022
Campeonato Paulista: 2020, 2022
Copa do Brasil: 2020
Copa Libertadores: 2020, 2021
Recopa Sudamericana: 2022

International
Brazil
Summer Olympics: 2016

Individual
Bola de Prata: 2020, 2021
Campeonato Brasileiro Série A Team of the Year: 2020, 2021, 2022
Copa do Brasil Best Goalkeeper: 2020
Copa do Brasil Team of the Final: 2020
Best Goalkeeper in Brazil: 2019, 2020, 2021
Copa Libertadores Team of the Tournament: 2020, 2021
South American Team of the Year: 2020, 2021, 2022
IFFHS CONMEBOL Team of the Year: 2021
Campeonato Paulista Team of the Year: 2021, 2022

References

External links

1987 births
Living people
People from Rio Branco, Acre
Brazilian footballers
Brazil international footballers
Association football goalkeepers
Campeonato Brasileiro Série A players
Campeonato Brasileiro Série B players
Copa Libertadores-winning players
Sport Club Corinthians Paulista players
Clube do Remo players
Oeste Futebol Clube players
América Futebol Clube (RN) players
Associação Portuguesa de Desportos players
Club Athletico Paranaense players
Olympic footballers of Brazil
Footballers at the 2016 Summer Olympics
Olympic gold medalists for Brazil
Olympic medalists in football
Medalists at the 2016 Summer Olympics
2021 Copa América players
2022 FIFA World Cup players
Sportspeople from Acre (state)